Ronald Jay Riley (born November 11, 1950) is an American retired professional basketball player. He played for the Kansas City-Omaha Kings and the Houston Rockets in the National Basketball Association (NBA) from 1972 to 1975. He played college basketball at the University of Southern California (USC).  He was inducted into the Pac-10 Basketball Hall of Honor in 2007.

References

External links
Finnish League profile

1950 births
Living people
African-American basketball players
American expatriate basketball people in Finland
American men's basketball players
Basketball players from Los Angeles
Houston Rockets players
Kansas City Kings draft picks
Kansas City Kings players
Power forwards (basketball)
USC Trojans men's basketball players
21st-century African-American people
20th-century African-American sportspeople